Machaonia woodburyana, the alfilerillo, is a species of plant in the family Rubiaceae. It is found in Saint John in the United States Virgin Islands and Virgin Gorda in the British Virgin Islands in the Caribbean.

Habitat
The natural habitats of Machaonia woodburyana are subtropical or tropical dry forests and subtropical or tropical dry shrubland. It is threatened by habitat loss.

See also
Tropical and subtropical dry broadleaf forests - biome

References

USDA Profile for Machaonia woodburyana (alfilerillo)

woodburyana
Flora of the United States Virgin Islands
Flora of the British Virgin Islands
Endemic flora of the United States
Endangered flora of the United States
Endangered plants
Taxonomy articles created by Polbot